Eric Denton (born February 8, 1978 in Falls Church, Virginia) is an American soccer player, currently without a club.

Career

College
Denton played college soccer at Santa Clara University from 1996 to 1999, playing in a total of 83 matches, and registering 7 goals and 14 assists.  In his senior season, Denton lead the Broncos to the College Cup, where the team lost to Indiana University; he was also named a first-team All-American.

Professional
Upon graduating, Denton was selected 19th overall in the 2000 MLS SuperDraft by D.C. United.  Denton earned a spot on the squad, starting 12 games as a rookie.  Although he began the 2001 as a starter for the team, he was traded in the middle of the year to the Tampa Bay Mutiny in exchange for Scott Vermillion.  Denton played briefly for the Mutiny, but the team was contracted at the end of 2001.  Upon Tampa Bay's contraction, Denton was selected by the Columbus Crew in the 2002 MLS Dispersal Draft.

Denton was immediately a starter at left back for the Crew, appearing in 23 games, and adding one goal and four assists.  He did much the same in 2003, playing in 26 games, scoring two goals and one assist.  Although he began the 2004 season as a starter, he was supplanted in the middle of the year by rookie Chris Wingert, and ended the season with only 18 appearances. The Crew cut Denton after the season, and he signed with the Colorado Rapids.  Following the 2006 season, Denton was waived by the Colorado Rapids. The New York Red Bulls picked up Denton via the waiver draft only to release him in March 2007.

Denton signed to Major League Soccer expansion side San Jose Earthquakes on its return to the league for the 2008 season, but was later waived on June 25, 2009.

Honors

Club
Columbus Crew SC
 Lamar Hunt U.S. Open Cup: 2002
 MLS Supporters' Shield: 2004

References

External links
 

1978 births
Living people
American soccer players
D.C. United players
MLS Pro-40 players
Tampa Bay Mutiny players
Columbus Crew players
Colorado Rapids players
New York Red Bulls players
San Jose Earthquakes players
Santa Clara Broncos men's soccer players
People from Falls Church, Virginia
Soccer players from Virginia
Major League Soccer players
A-League (1995–2004) players
D.C. United draft picks
United States men's under-23 international soccer players
All-American men's college soccer players
Association football defenders